Carlin Glynn (born February 19, 1940) is an American singer and retired actress. She is the mother of actress Mary Stuart Masterson.

Life and career
Glynn was born in Cleveland, Ohio. She attended Mirabeau B. Lamar High School in Houston, Texas.

A life member of The Actors Studio, Glynn made her belated but Tony-winning Broadway debut - as 1979's Outstanding Featured Actress in a Musical - portraying "Mona Stangley" in the original production of The Best Little Whorehouse in Texas, a musical comedy adapted by Glynn's husband and fellow Studio member, Peter Masterson, from a non-fiction article published in Playboy, in collaboration with the article's author, Larry L. King, and songwriter Carol Hall, and developed at length in workshop performances at the Studio. Glynn's award-winning performance would be reprised in the 1982 revival.

Glynn's first movie appearance was as Mae Barber in Three Days of the Condor (1975). She is also known for her role as mother to Molly Ringwald's character in Sixteen Candles (1984), and as daughter-in-law to Geraldine Page's character in The Trip to Bountiful (1985), directed by her husband. Her other film credits include roles in Resurrection (1980), Continental Divide (1981), The Escape Artist (1982), Gardens of Stone (1987)(where her husband and daughter also had roles), Blood Red (1989), Night Game (1989), Convicts (1991), Judy Berlin (1999) and Whiskey School (2005).

References

External links

 Peter Masterson and Carlin Glynn Papers at the Harry Ransom Center
 
 

1940 births
Living people
Actresses from Cleveland
American musical theatre actresses
Laurence Olivier Award winners
Theatre World Award winners
Tony Award winners
Lamar High School (Houston, Texas) alumni